East Foothills is a census-designated place (CDP) in Santa Clara County, California, United States and a neighborhood of San Jose. The population was 8,269 at the 2010 census and it is located about 4 miles east of downtown San Jose.

Geography
East Foothills is located at  (37.383989, -121.822396).

Demographics

2010
The 2010 United States Census reported that East Foothills had a population of 8,269. The racial makeup of East Foothills was 4,853 (58.7%) White, 205 (2.5%) African American, 78 (0.9%) Native American, 1,445 (17.5%) Asian, 41 (0.5%) Pacific Islander, 1,219 (14.7%) from other races, and 428 (5.2%) from two or more races. Hispanic or Latino of any race were 3,118 persons (37.7%).

The Census reported that 8,238 people (99.6% of the population) lived in households, 26 (0.3%) lived in non-institutionalized group quarters, and 5 (0.1%) were institutionalized.

There were 2,698 households, out of which 928 (34.4%) had children under the age of 18 living in them, 1,631 (60.5%) were opposite-sex married couples living together, 284 (10.5%) had a female householder with no husband present, 148 (5.5%) had a male householder with no wife present.  There were 111 (4.1%) unmarried opposite-sex partnerships, and 29 (1.1%) same-sex married couples or partnerships. 475 households (17.6%) were made up of individuals, and 248 (9.2%) had someone living alone who was 65 years of age or older. The average household size was 3.05.  There were 2,063 families (76.5% of all households); the average family size was 3.42.

The population was spread out, with 1,820 people (22.0%) under the age of 18, 698 people (8.4%) aged 18 to 24, 1,936 people (23.4%) aged 25 to 44, 2,521 people (30.5%) aged 45 to 64, and 1,294 people (15.6%) who were 65 years of age or older.  The median age was 42.0 years. For every 100 females, there were 99.9 males.  For every 100 females age 18 and over, there were 96.7 males.

The homeowner vacancy rate was 1.3%; the rental vacancy rate was 5.3%.  6,767 people (81.8% of the population) lived in owner-occupied housing units and 1,471 people (17.8%) lived in rental housing units.

2000
As of the census of 2000, there were 8,133 people, 2,711 households, and 2,090 families residing in the CDP.  The population density was 1,365.3/km2 (3,540.6/mi2).  There were 2,749 housing units at an average density of 461.5/km2 (1,196.7/mi2).  The racial makeup of the CDP was 67.67% White, 2.83% African American, 1.00% Native American, 10.77% Asian, 0.16% Pacific Islander, 11.25% from other races, and 6.32% from two or more races. Hispanic or Latino of any race were 28.69% of the population.

There were 2,711 households, out of which 30.7% had children under the age of 18 living with them, 63.3% were married couples living together, 9.5% had a female householder with no husband present, and 22.9% were non-families. 15.2% of all households were made up of individuals, and 7.3% had someone living alone who was 65 years of age or older.  The average household size was 2.97 and the average family size was 3.30.

In the CDP, the population was spread out, with 22.6% under the age of 18, 7.0% from 18 to 24, 29.2% from 25 to 44, 25.7% from 45 to 64, and 15.5% who were 65 years of age or older.  The median age was 40 years. For every 100 females, there were 98.7 males.  For every 100 females age 18 and over, there were 95.7 males.

The median income for a household in the CDP was $74,849, and the median income for a family was $86,941. Males had a median income of $60,477 versus $38,111 for females. The per capita income for the CDP was $35,354.  About 1.3% of families and 3.0% of the population were below the poverty line, including 0.7% of those under age 18 and 5.8% of those age 65 or over.

Government

References

External links
City of San Jose, Council District 5

Census-designated places in Santa Clara County, California
Neighborhoods in San Jose, California
Census-designated places in California